Perth Montessori is a boutique, independent, co-educational school for children from birth to 18 years. It is located in Burswood, an inner-city suburb of Perth, Western Australia.

History
The school began in 1980 as the Victoria Park Montessori Playgroup, before becoming the Montessori Children's Centre with the opening of the first Children's House, Hibiscus, in 1982. Anne Zekas was the first Principal. 

In 2000, Gary Pears joined the School as the Principal. The Centre changed its name to the Perth Montessori School and became a registered not-for-profit association. 

The school first began accepting secondary enrolments in 2007.

Campus 
The campus expanded throughout the 1980s and early 1990s, increasing the size of its primary education facilities and obtaining a second property. It expanded further in 2006 acquiring an adjoining property on Burswood Road, which now houses the school reception, offices, Cycle 4 & 5 classes and other ancillary teaching areas.

2018 Name Change 
In 2018, the then Board changed the school's name to Perth Individual. 

At the AGM held in 2021, School Members voted to return to the Perth Montessori name. This transition was completed in July 2022 when the School's Registered name returned to Perth Montessori. The School's registered charity name, Perth Montessori School Inc., has remained the same since it was originally established.

External links 
Official website

Educational institutions established in 1980
Montessori schools in Australia
Private schools in Perth, Western Australia
1980 establishments in Australia